Massimo Bogana is an Italian bobsledder who competed in the late 1950s. He won the bronze medal in the four-man event at the 1958 FIBT World Championships in Garmisch-Partenkirchen.

References
Bobsleigh four-man world championship medalists since 1930

Italian male bobsledders
Year of birth missing (living people)
Possibly living people